The 1987–88 Boston University Terriers men's basketball team represented Boston University during the 1987–88 NCAA Division I men's basketball season. The Terriers, led by third year head coach Mike Jarvis, played their home games at Case Gym and were members of the Eastern College Athletic Conference-North. They finished the season 23–8, 14–4 in ECAC-N play to finish in 2nd place during the conference regular season. The Terriers won the ECAC North tournament to receive an automatic bid to the NCAA tournament as No. 15 seed in the East region. Boston University was defeated by No. 2 seed Duke in the opening round, 85–69.

Roster

Schedule and results

|-
!colspan=9 style=| Regular season

|-
!colspan=9 style=| ECAC North tournament

|-
!colspan=9 style=| NCAA tournament

References

Boston University Terriers men's basketball seasons
Boston University
Boston University
Boston University Terriers men's basketball team
Boston University Terriers men's basketball team